The Battle of Gataskogen was fought on 3 March 1365, near Enköping. The battle was part of the power struggle for the Swedish throne. Warring parties were, on one side, the former King Magnus Eriksson and his recently deposed son Håkan Magnusson, and on the other, Albert of Mecklenburg, who had recently been elected king of Sweden, and his mercenaries.

The battle resulted in victory for Albert and Magnus Eriksson was captured. King Albert had thus secured his hold on power.

References

Gataskogen
1365 in Europe
14th century in Sweden
Gataskogen